Srđan Marliović (November 5, 1967 - August 4, 2013) was a Serbian sprint canoer who competed as an Independent Olympic Participant at the 1992 Summer Olympics in Barcelona. He was eliminated in the repechages of both the K-1 1000 m and the K-2 1000 m events.

References
Sports-Reference.com profile

1967 births
2013 deaths
Serbian male canoeists
Yugoslav male canoeists
Canoeists at the 1992 Summer Olympics
Olympic canoeists as Independent Olympic Participants
Sportspeople from Pančevo